Jeanne Jugan (October 25, 1792 – August 29, 1879), also known as Sister Mary of the Cross, L.S.P., was a French woman who became known for the dedication of her life to the neediest of the elderly poor. Her service resulted in the establishment of the Little Sisters of the Poor, who care for the elderly who have no other resources throughout the world. She has been declared a saint by the Catholic Church.

Life

Early life
Jugan was born October 25, 1792, in the port city of Cancale in Brittany, the sixth of the eight children of Joseph and Marie Jugan.  She grew up during the political and religious upheavals of the French Revolution. Four years after she was born, her father, a fisherman, was lost at sea. Her mother struggled to provide for the young Jeanne and her siblings, while also providing them secretly with religious instruction amid the anti-Catholic persecutions of the day.

Jugan worked as a shepherdess while still very young, and learned to knit and spin wool. She could barely read and write. When she was 16, she took a job as the kitchen maid of the Viscountess de la Choue. The viscountess, a devout Catholic, had Jugan accompany her when she visited the sick and the poor.

At age 18, and again six years later, she declined marriage proposals from the same man. She told her mother that God had other plans, and was calling her to “a work which is not yet founded”. At age 25, the young woman became an Associate of the Congregation of Jesus and Mary founded by John Eudes (Eudists). Jugan also worked as a nurse in the town hospital of Saint-Servan. She worked hard at this physically demanding job but after six years, she left the hospital due to her own health issues. She then worked for 12 years as the servant of a fellow member of the Eudist Third Order, until the woman's death in 1835. In the course of Jugan's duties, the two women recognized a similar Catholic spirituality and began to teach catechism to the children of the town and to care for the poor and other unfortunates.

In 1837, Jugan and a 72-year-old woman (Françoise Aubert) rented part of a small cottage and were joined by Virginie Tredaniel, a 17-year-old orphan. These three women then formed a Catholic community of prayer, devoted to teaching the catechism and assisting the poor.

Foundress
In the winter of 1839, Jugan encountered Anne Chauvin, an elderly woman who was blind, partially paralyzed, and had no one to care for her. Jugan carried her home to her apartment and took her in from that day forward, letting the woman have her bed while she slept in the attic. She soon took in two more old women in need of help, and by 1841 she had rented a room to provide housing for a dozen elderly people. The following year, she acquired an unused convent building that could house 40 of them. From this act of charity, with the approval of her colleagues, Jeanne then focused her attention upon the mission of assisting abandoned elderly women, and from this beginning arose a religious congregation called The Little Sisters of the Poor. Jugan wrote a simple Rule of Life for this new community of women, and they went door-to-door daily requesting food, clothing and money for the women in their care. This became Jugan's life work, and she performed this mission for the next four decades.

During the 1840s, many other young women joined Jugan in her mission of service to the elderly poor. By begging in the streets, the foundress was able to establish four more homes for their beneficiaries by the end of the decade.

In 1847 based on the request of Leo Dupont (known as the Holy Man of Tours) she established a house in that city. She was much sought after whenever problems arose and worked with religious and civil authorities to seek help for the poor.  By 1850, over 100 women had joined the congregation.

Jugan, however, was forced out of her leadership role by the Abbé Auguste Le Pailleur, the priest who had been appointed Superior General of the congregation by the local bishop. In an apparent effort to suppress her true role as foundress, he assigned her to do nothing but begging on the street until she was sent into retirement and a life of obscurity for 27 years. Her eyesight was impaired in her final years.

Expansion
After communities of Little Sisters had begun to spread throughout France, the work expanded to England in 1851. From 1866 to 1871 five communities of Little Sisters were founded across the United States. By 1879, the community Jeanne founded had 2,400 Little Sisters and had spread across Europe and to North America. On 1 March that year, Pope Leo XIII approved the Constitutions for the Little Sisters of the Poor for an initial period of seven years. At the time of her death on August 29 1879, many of the Little Sisters did not know that she was the one to have founded the congregation. Le Pailleur, however, was investigated and dismissed in 1890, and Jugan came to be acknowledged as their foundress.

In September 1885, the congregation arrived in South America and made a first foundation in Valparaíso, Chile, from which it expanded later on.

Veneration
Jugan died in 1879 at the age of 86, and was buried in the graveyard of the General Motherhouse at Saint-Pern. She was beatified in Rome by Pope John Paul II on October 3, 1982, and canonized on October 11, 2009, by Pope Benedict XVI, who said, "In the Beatitudes, Jeanne Jugan found the source of the spirit of hospitality and fraternal love, founded on unlimited trust in Providence, which illuminated her whole life."

Today, pilgrims can visit the house where she was born, the House of the Cross at Saint-Servan and the motherhouse where she lived her last 23 years at La Tour Saint Joseph in Saint-Pern.

Legacy
The Sisters at the Queen of Peace Residence in Queens Village, New York established the Jeanne Jugan Award which is presented to the staff member who best exemplifies the spirit of Jeanne Jugan.

See also
 Mary Angeline Teresa McCrory: Carmelite Sisters for the Aged and Infirm
 Teresa Jornet Ibars: Little Sisters of the Abandoned Elderly

References

Sources
 Paul Milcen, 2000 Jeanne Jugan: Humble, So as to Love More Darton, Longman & Todd

External links
 Little Sisters of the Poor Official website
 Online video of the Motherhouse at La Tour Saint Joseph
 Catholic Online article on "Bl. Jeanne Jugan"
 Catholic Founders article on "Jeanne Jugan"
 Little Sisters of the Poor, San Pedro, California: A Biography of Jeanne Jugan
 The Life of Blessed Jeanne Jugan (Sister Mary of the Cross) - full online book

1792 births
1879 deaths
People from Ille-et-Vilaine
Roman Catholic activists
Founders of Catholic religious communities
19th-century French nuns
Burials in Brittany
Beatifications by Pope John Paul II
Canonizations by Pope Benedict XVI
18th-century Christian saints
19th-century Christian saints
Breton saints
Christian female saints of the Early Modern era
Christian female saints of the Late Modern era
Venerated Catholics by Pope John Paul II